Lough Island Reavy is a small man-made lough in Kilcoo, County Down, Northern Ireland. It is a fishing spot, which is controlled by the Kilcoo Angling Club. The lake contains pike and perch, as well as small numbers of wild brown trout and eels.

Gallery

See also
List of loughs in Ireland

Lakes of County Down